Inge Weiss (born 1923) is a German–American dancer and choreographer. She danced with Mary Wigman, one of the early pioneers of modern dance. She retired from Stanford University in the 1990s.

Early life
Weiss was born in Hannover, Germany in 1923. Her mother was born in Germany while her father, born in Warta, Poland, worked in Germany manufacturing men's clothing. She has a Jewish education and her family were active in the Jewish community.

World War II
In October 1938, her family were deported to Poland, ending up in Spoczynek living with relatives in crowded stables. Her family were then deported to Krakow and lived in poor conditions until 1941. In 1944, she was deported to Auschwitz and then on to Bergen-Belsen in September 1944, where she got a job distributing bread as she was able to speak German. During her time in the camp, she contracted typhoid prior to liberation, where she then recovered in the German officers' quarters before returning to Hannover in 1946.

Post war
In 1947, she got married and gave birth to a son in 1948. She moved to the United States in September 1949, settling in Cleveland, Ohio.

References 

1923 births
Possibly living people
21st-century American women
American choreographers
American dancers
American female dancers
American people of German descent
Modern dancers
Stanford University faculty